Natascia Leonardi Cortesi (born 1 May 1971) is a Swiss cross-country skier and ski mountaineer who has competed since 1988 in the World Cup circuit. She won a bronze medal in the 4 × 5 km relay at the 2002 Winter Olympics in Salt Lake City and had her best individual finish with a tenth place in the 30 km event at those same games. This was the first olympic medal ever for a Swiss woman cross-country team. Leonardi Cortesi's best score at the FIS Nordic World Ski Championships was a fifth place in the 4 × 5 km relay in 1999.
 
In Ski mountaineering she won 2005 the Trofeo Mezzalama with Gloriana Pellisier and Christiane Nex. 2006 she was vertical race world champion.

At the Worldloppet she won three times her home-race the Engadin Skimarathon in 2003, 2005 and 2006. She was the first Swiss woman to win the Kangaroo Hoppet 2006 in Australia and 2011 the Transjurassienne in France.

Cross-country skiing results
All results are sourced from the International Ski Federation (FIS).

Olympic Games
 1 medal – (1 bronze)

World Championships

a.  Cancelled due to extremely cold weather.

World Cup

Season standings

References

External links
 
 
 

Swiss female cross-country skiers
Cross-country skiers at the 1992 Winter Olympics
Cross-country skiers at the 1998 Winter Olympics
Cross-country skiers at the 2002 Winter Olympics
Cross-country skiers at the 2006 Winter Olympics
Swiss female ski mountaineers
World ski mountaineering champions
Olympic bronze medalists for Switzerland
Olympic cross-country skiers of Switzerland
Living people
1971 births
Olympic medalists in cross-country skiing
Medalists at the 2002 Winter Olympics
20th-century Swiss women
21st-century Swiss women